Alone Again and Other Hits is a compilation album released by the 1980s heavy metal band Dokken.

Track listing 
 "Alone Again" (Don Dokken, Jeff Pilson) - 4:21
 "Dream Warriors" (George Lynch, Pilson) - 4:47
 "In My Dreams" (Pilson, Lynch, Dokken, Mick Brown) - 4:19
 "Just Got Lucky" (Lynch, Pilson) - 4:36
 "Stop Fighting Love" (Pilson, Lynch, Dokken, Brown) - 4:52
 "Heaven Sent" (Dokken, Lynch, Pilson) - 4:53
 "The Hunter" (Pilson, Lynch, Dokken, Brown) - 4:08
 "Slippin' Away" (Pilson, Lynch, Dokken, Brown) - 3:48
 "Jaded Heart" (Pilson, Lynch, Dokken, Brown) - 4:18
 "Breaking the Chains" (Dokken, Lynch) - 3:50

Personnel 
 Don Dokken - lead vocals, additional guitars
 George Lynch - lead and rhythm guitars
 Jeff Pilson - bass, backing vocals
 "Wild" Mick Brown - drums, backing vocals
 Peter Baltes - bass on "Breaking the Chains"

References 

Dokken compilation albums
2003 compilation albums
Rhino Records compilation albums